Matthew Stevens (born 1982) is a Canadian jazz guitarist and composer.

Biography 
Stevens was born on 8 January 1982 in Toronto, Ontario, Canada, and studied piano and guitar at a young age. Since graduating from Berklee College of Music in 2004, Stevens has established himself in the contemporary jazz scene performing and recording with numerous artists including Christian Scott, Terri Lyne Carrington, and Esperanza Spalding.

Regarded to be one of "most exciting up-and-coming jazz guitarists" in his generation, Stevens was placed in the Rising Star Guitar Category of the 63rd Annual DownBeat Critics Poll. His performances have been esteemed by numerous publications including Down Beat, NPR, Jazz Times, Billboard, and The New York Times.

His debut album as a leader, Woodwork, received stellar reviews from critics including Down Beat, All About Jazz, and the Ottawa Citizen. LA Weekly describes the album as "an amalgamation of modern jazz and neo-fusion elements which showcase ... sonic versatility and savvy producing chops".

Stevens has toured extensively in the US, Canada, Europe, Asia, South Africa, and South America. He is also a member of the adjunct faculty at the New School and has taught workshops at the Maryland Summer Jazz Workshop, USC, and Berklee College of Music.

Stevens currently resides in New York City, New York.

Awards and honors
2015: DownBeat magazine: The 63rd Annual DownBeat Critics Poll / Rising Star Guitar Category
2016: DownBeat magazine: “25 for the Future”

Discography

As a leader 
 Woodwork (Whirlwind), 2015)
 Preverbal (Ropeadope, 2017)
 Pittsburgh (Whirlwind), 2021)

As a sideman

References

External links

 Official site

1982 births
Living people
Musicians from Toronto
Canadian jazz guitarists
Canadian male guitarists
21st-century Canadian guitarists
21st-century Canadian male musicians
Canadian male jazz musicians
Grammy Award winners
Whirlwind Recordings artists